Bose may refer to:

 Bose (crater), a lunar crater
 Bose (film), a 2004 Indian Tamil film starring Srikanth and Sneha
 Bose (surname), a surname (and list of people with the name)
 Bose, Italy, a frazioni in Magnano, Province of Biella
 Bose Monastic Community, a monastic community in the village
 Bose, Poland
 Bose Corporation, an audio company
 Bose Ogulu, Nigerian manager of Burna Boy
 Baise, or Bose, a prefecture-level city in Guangxi, China

See also
 
 Boise (disambiguation)
 Bos (disambiguation)
 Bose–Einstein (disambiguation), relating to Satyendra Nath Bose
 Basu